Kande is an Indian Punjabi-language romantic action comedy movie directed by Kavi Raz and produced by VRV Production. It stars Preet Baath opposite Kamal Virk. The movie opened worldwide on 11 May 2018.

Plot 
Jind Kaur is a reputable woman. Chandu Pehlwan, on the other hand, has made a name for himself with his notoriety. Both Chandu Pehlwan and Jind Kaur have had their differences in the past, and those differences are heightened by time. The fight that started in the previous generation takes a toll on the coming generation to obtain their objectives. Both Jind Kaur and Chandu Pehlwan raise their children as they would like themselves to be in their respective world. Mehar (Preet Baath) is the village kabaddi champion, who has lived by every word his mother (Jind Kaur) has taught him. Whereas Baaz is his father's (Chandu Pehlwan) perfect prodigy, learning every dirty trick in the book to defeat the enemy. After losing the village kabaddi championship, the opposing team's captain Baaz takes the loss personally and vows to take his revenge. Mehar gets lost in the labyrinth of addiction which puts a  strain on relations and reveals the inner frustrations rising up in everyone's heart.

Cast 
 Preet Baath as Mehar
 Kamal Virk as Resham
 Yograj Singh as Chandu Pehlwan
 Sunita Dhir as Jind Kaur
 B. N. Sharma as Daler Singh
 Baaz as Baaz
 Jeet Rudka as Sarpanch
 Jobanpreet Singh as Deepa

Song list

References

External links
  

2018 films
Punjabi-language Indian films
2010s Punjabi-language films
Kabaddi in India
Indian romantic action films
Indian romantic comedy films
Indian sports films